Private Hell may refer to:

Private Hell 36, a 1954 film noir directed by Don Siegel
Private Hell, a 1962 novel by George H. Smith
"Private Hell", a song by Alice in Chains from Black Gives Way to Blue
"Private Hell", a song by Iggy Pop from Skull Ring
"Private Hell", a song by Imperial Drag from Demos
"Private Hell", a song by Jackyl from Push Comes to Shove
"Private Hell", a song by Misery Loves Co. from Misery Loves Co.
"Private Hell", a song by The Jam from Setting Sons
"Private Hell", a song by Zan Clan from Citizen of Wasteland